Israel Pereira Stroh (born 6 September 1986) is a Brazilian para table tennis player who competes in international elite competitions. He is a Paralympic silver medalist, Pan American champion and a Parapan American Games silver medalist and he was the first Brazilian player to win a medal in a singles event. He used to be a sports journalist who worked for Lance! before he started playing table tennis competitively.

References

1986 births
Living people
Sportspeople from Santos, São Paulo
Paralympic table tennis players of Brazil
Brazilian male table tennis players
Table tennis players at the 2016 Summer Paralympics
Medalists at the 2016 Summer Paralympics
Medalists at the 2015 Parapan American Games
Brazilian sports journalists
Table tennis players at the 2020 Summer Paralympics
21st-century Brazilian people